Soveychti-ye Yek (also Romanized as Soveychtī-ye Yek; also known as Soveyḩetī-ye Yek) is a village in Gharb-e Karun Rural District, in the Central District of Khorramshahr County, Khuzestan Province, Iran. At the 2006 census, its population was 273, in 46 families.

References 

Populated places in Khorramshahr County